Oleksandr Ivanov (born 23 November 1965 in Kharkiv) is a Ukrainian professional football coach and a former player.

Career
Since 2014 till 2016, he worked as an assistant coach with FC Dnipro Dnipropetrovsk.

He played 4 games in the European Cup Winners' Cup 1988–89 for FC Metalist Kharkiv.

Honours
 Soviet Cup winner: 1988.
 USSR Federation Cup finalist: 1987, 1989.

External links
 

1965 births
Living people
Footballers from Kharkiv
Soviet footballers
Soviet expatriate footballers
Ukrainian footballers
Ukrainian expatriate footballers
Expatriate footballers in Finland
Expatriate footballers in Russia
Expatriate footballers in Hungary
Soviet expatriate sportspeople in Finland
Ukrainian expatriate sportspeople in Finland
Ukrainian expatriate sportspeople in Russia
Ukrainian expatriate sportspeople in Hungary
FC Metalist Kharkiv players
Turun Palloseura footballers
FC Dynamo-2 Kyiv players
FC Torpedo Zaporizhzhia players
FC Vorskla Poltava players
FC Arsenal Kyiv players
FC Ahrotekhservis Sumy players
MFC Mykolaiv players
Dunaújváros FC players
FC Hoverla Uzhhorod players
Ukrainian Premier League players
Ukrainian First League players
Veikkausliiga players
Ukrainian football managers
FC Metalist 1925 Kharkiv managers
FC Ahrobiznes Volochysk managers
Association football forwards